Tempane is a town and capital of Tempane District in the Upper East Region of Ghana. The town is known for the Garu Tempane Secondary School.  The school is a second cycle institution.

References

Populated places in the Upper East Region